Daniela Dimitrovska (born 4 June 1979 in Skopje) or simply Dani, is a Macedonian pop music singer.

Biography 
Dimitrovska started her career on the music contest Makfest in Štip with the song "Samo Ti Mi Trebaš". The single was well accepted both by audience and journalists. In 2000, she appeared on the national selection for Eurovision Song Contest with the song "A Nekogaš". The same year, she gave birth to her child, called Lazar. After her divorce, she decided to take a career break to raise her little son. The song "Srca Dve" (English: "Two Hearts" ) was her big comeback and it is considered to be Dimitrovska's greatest hit placing her on number 1 on all Macedonian charts for a month, and # 4 on MTV Adria. Dimitrovska was the first Macedonian singer to reach a place on the MTV Adria Top 20 chart.

Singles 
 "Samo Ti Mi Trebaš" (English: I Need Only You)
 "A Nekogaš" (English: And Sometime)
 "Site Dragi Lugje" (English: All Dear People)
 "Vidi Me" (English: See Me)
 "Ostavam Se" (English: I'm Leaving Everything)
 "Kaži Mi" (English: Tell Me)
 "Srca Dve" (English: Two Hearts) (#1 in the Macedonia; #4 on MTV Adria)
 "Crveni Doždovi" (English: Red Rain) (#1 in Macedonia)
 "A Što Do Togaš?" (English: What Until Then?)(#1 in Macedonia; #8 on MTV Adria)
 "Najdobra" (English: The Best) (#1 in Macedonia)
 "Nikoj Kako Ti" (English: Nobody is like you) (Winner of Ohrid Fest 2008)

Albums 
 Ti Da Me Imaš (2006)
 Vo Megjuvreme (2010)
 Grad Za Ljubov (2017)

See also
Music of North Macedonia

External links 
 Official Website

1979 births
Living people
Musicians from Skopje
21st-century Macedonian women singers
Macedonian pop singers

Профилот на Дани Димитровска на ВБУ Музички регистар https://www.muzichkiregistar.com/AuthorDetails.aspx?id=12106